Hieb is a surname. Notable people with the surname include: 

 James Hieb, American politician
 Richard Hieb (born 1955), American astronaut

See also
 Hiebel